Brian Fairbairn (born 7 April 1983) is a former Scottish professional footballer who played as a midfielder for Hibernians and Cowdenbeath.

Club career

Livingston
Fairbairn came through the youth ranks at Livingston, but left the club without making a single first team appearance.

East Stirling and Gretna
He signed for East Stirling in 2002, making his league debut in a 1-1 draw against Greenock Morton.

The midfielder scored 2 goals in 13 appearances for the Shire before leaving in January 2003 to sign for Gretna, where he also netted twice in 13 appearances in a short spell at the club in the second half of the 2002/2003 season.

East Fife and Raith Rovers
Fairbairn signed for East Fife in 2003.  He scored on his league debut in a 3-2 win over Stenhousemuir.  He scored 9 goals in 55 league appearances before earning a move to Raith Rovers.

He enjoyed 2 seasons at the Rovers before leaving to sign for Alloa.

Alloa, Berwick Rangers and Cowdenbeath
He turned out 7 times for the Wasps before signing for Berwick Rangers where he scored once in 13 league appearances.

The midfield man signed for Cowdenbeath in 2008 and enjoyed a successful spell at the club, helping the club to successive promotions from Scottish Football League Third Division in 2008-2009 and from Scottish Football League Second Division in 2009-2010.

Hibernians, Bathgate and Broxburn
In 2011, Fairbairn signed for Maltese side Hibernians.

The spell abroad was short lived and after 6 months, he returned home to Scotland to sign for Bathgate.

Fairbairn then signed for Broxburn Athletic in 2014.  He initially left the club in 2015, but resigned for the Brox in 2016.

Honours
Cowdenbeath
Scottish Third Division runner up: 2008-2009
Scottish Second Division runner up: 2009-2010

References

External links
Brian Fairbairn on Soccerbase

1983 births
Living people
Scottish footballers
Scottish Football League players
Association football forwards
Hibernians F.C. players
Livingston F.C. players
East Stirlingshire F.C. players
Alloa Athletic F.C. players
Berwick Rangers F.C. players
Raith Rovers F.C. players
Cowdenbeath F.C. players
Bathgate F.C. players
Broxburn Athletic F.C. players
East Fife F.C. players
Gretna F.C. players
Sportspeople from Livingston, West Lothian
Sportspeople from Broxburn, West Lothian
Footballers from West Lothian